Red Sea Football Club is an Eritrean professional football club based in Asmara. With 13 league titles they are the most successful club in the country.

History
Red Sea FC was founded in 1945. After the 2011 Kagame Interclub Cup in Tanzania, thirteen members of the team did not return home to Eritrea and sought political asylum.

Achievements
Eritrean Premier League: 13
1995, 1998, 1999, 2000, 2002, 2005, 2009, 2010, 2011, 2012, 2013, 2014, 2019

International competitions
The following is a list of results for Red Sea FC in international competitions. Red Sea FC’s scores are listed first.

References

External links
Global Sports Archive profile

Football clubs in Eritrea